Fenerbahçe Swimming is the men's and women's swimming department of Fenerbahçe S.K., a major sports club in Istanbul, Turkey. Homeground and training place are the club's own Dereağzı Facilities.

Founded in 1913, the swimming department of Fenerbahçe is the most successful in Turkey, with the men's team having won 23 national championships and the women's team a record 33 national championships altogether. In the combined category they won a total of 23 national championships, which is also a Turkish record.

Honours (Men)

International competitions
 CIJ Meet
Winners (2): 2004, 2005
Runners-up (2): 1999, 2003

National competitions
National Championships - 23
Turkish Winter Championship
Winners (10): 1998, 1999, 2000, 2001, 2004, 2005, 2006, 2007, 2008, 2009
Turkish Summer Championship
Winners (8): 1998, 1999, 2000, 2003, 2004, 2005, 2007, 2013
Turkish Short Course Championship
Winners (5): 2007, 2008, 2009, 2010, 2015

Honours (Women)

National competitions
National Championships - 33 (record)
Turkish Summer Championship
Winners (15): 1998, 1999, 2000, 2003, 2004, 2005, 2006, 2007, 2010, 2011, 2012, 2013, 2014, 2015, 2016
Turkish Winter Championship
Winners (9): 1999, 2000, 2004, 2005, 2006, 2007, 2008, 2009, 2010
Turkish Short Course Championship
Winners (9): 2007, 2008, 2009, 2010, 2012, 2013, 2014, 2015, 2016

Regional Championships
Istanbul Championship
Winners (1): 1933

Technical and Managerial Staff

Current squad

External links
Swimming page of the official website 
Unofficial website 
Official website 

Swimming
Sport in Kadıköy
Swim teams
Swimming in Turkey
1913 establishments in the Ottoman Empire